Dragan Milovanović (born 1 March 1986) is a Serbian footballer who plays for OFK Beograd.

Career
In 2014 Milovanović moved to Kyrgyzstan League side Dordoi Bishkek, winning his first trophy with Dordoi, the Kyrgyzstan Super Cup, on 24 March 2014. In August 2014, Milovanović returned to Serbia, signing for Serbian SuperLiga side Radnički 1923.

Previously Milovanović played for FK Obilić, FK Mladi Obilić, FK Napredak Kruševac and FK Borac Čačak.

Career statistics

Club

Honours

Club
Dordoi Bishkek
Kyrgyzstan Super Cup Winner (1): 2014

References

External links
 Profile and stats at Srbijafudbal
 

1986 births
Living people
Footballers from Belgrade
Serbian footballers
FK Obilić players
FK Mladi Obilić players
FK Napredak Kruševac players
FK Borac Čačak players
FK Čukarički players
FK Radnički 1923 players
FK Metalac Gornji Milanovac players
FK Jagodina players
FK Trayal Kruševac players
OFK Beograd players
Serbian First League players
Serbian SuperLiga players
Association football forwards